Doces Bárbaros is a 1976 album by the Música popular brasileira supergroup of the same name. It was recorded June 24 of that year at Anhembi Stadium in São Paulo.  Its members were  Gilberto Gil, Caetano Veloso, Maria Bethânia and Gal Costa, four of the biggest names in the history of the music of Brazil.  The band was the subject of a 1977 documentary directed by Jom Tob Azulay.   In 1994, they performed a tribute concert to Mangueira school of samba.

It was listed by Rolling Stone Brazil as one of the 100 best Brazilian albums in history.

A documentary of the show was made during  the show's Brazilian tour in 1976, it opened in theaters all over Brazil in 1977.

Cover art 
Each member's agent wanted their respective artist to appear first on the cover. In order to please the four of them, artist Aldo Luiz used a picture by Orlando Abrunhosa. In the photograph, all members are lying down on the ground and forming an "x", but only their heads are shown. The agents were then convinced that each member could be considered the first depending on the viewer's perspective.

Track listing

References

External links 

1976 live albums
Gilberto Gil albums
Caetano Veloso live albums
Maria Bethânia albums
Gal Costa albums
Portuguese-language live albums